P. R. Ramesh is an Indian politician who served as Mayor of Bangalore and Nominated Member of Karnataka Legislative Council.

Personal life 
He was born to P. Rudramurthy in Bangalore. He is married to K. Saraswati and has one son and one daughter.

References 

Year of birth missing (living people)
Living people
Members of the Karnataka Legislative Council